USS Prentiss is a United States Navy ship name and may refer to the following:

 , a World War II Tolland-class attack cargo ship of the United States Navy named after Prentiss County, Mississippi.
  (U.S. merchant ship id# 209585), named after businessman Alfred G. Prentiss, a commercial vessel that served in WWI as a USN tug.

See also
 Prentiss (disambiguation)

Prentiss